The Estadio Mario Alberto Kempes, formerly known as Estadio Córdoba, is a stadium in the Chateau Carreras neighborhood of Córdoba, Argentina. Owned by the Córdoba Province, the venue is used mostly for association football and rugby union matches and also sometimes for athletics.

The stadium was built in 1976 in preparation for the 1978 FIFA World Cup, with a capacity for 37,851 spectators although it doesn't provide seating for all of them, like many Argentine stadiums.

Most football teams in Córdoba have their own stadiums but they usually prefer playing in this stadium for its size and comfort, especially when playing important games that attract big crowds. Generally, this stadium is used for Talleres' matches, and is used for Belgrano's, Instituto's and Racing's matches. The Argentina national football team home matches have also been played here.

The stadium, in 2006 and 2007, hosted some Special Stages of motorsport event named Rally Argentina, a round of the World Rally Championship.

During 2010 and 2011 the stadium went through a remodelling process. The field was sunken 4 metres, the iconic Autotrol scoreboards installed for the 1978 World Cup were replaced with modern video screens, new  stands were built in order to improve the poor view caused by the shallow shape of the stadium and the capacity was increased to 57,000, becoming the third largest stadium in Argentina by seating capacity. It was re-opened on June 26, 2011, just 5 days before the start of the 2011 Copa América. The stands were fully covered after the cup.

In October, 2010 the name was changed to honour Mario Kempes, former Argentina national team player and top goal scorer of the 1978 FIFA World Cup, who was also a native of Córdoba.

History 
The construction of the stadium was commissioned to "Sánchez Elía-Peralta Ramos" Architects studio of Buenos Aires, which then associated with architects of Córdoba to carry out the project. In 1976, the military government of Argentina led by Jorge Rafael Videla, created a self-governing entity ("EAM 78") that took over remodelation and construction of stadium and buildings for the 1978 FIFA World Cup that would be held in Argentina.

Aport from Estadio Olímpico, other stadiums to be refurbished for the World Cup were River Plate, Vélez Sarsfield, Ciudad de Mendoza, Mar del Plata Stadium. Since the projects were launched, costs of constructions raised to US$ 520 million, five times higher than 1982 World Cup.

The stadium was finally inaugurated on May 16, 1978, in a match where Argentina played a local combined. The first World Cup held in the Chateau Carreras stadium was the Peru 3 v Scotland 1, on June 3.

In October 2010, the Legislature of Córdoba Province approved the change of name of the stadium to "Mario Alberto Kempes" to honor the former footballer born in the province. That changed had been driven by local journalist Claudio Menditto on his article "A tribute for Matador", published in 2008.

The Mario Kempes stadium was later refurbished in preparation for the 2011 Copa América, and inaugurated on July 26, 2011. Works included positioning of roof on grandstands, and an expansion to 57,000 spectators. Besides, all the lightning was renovated.

Sporting events

1978 FIFA World Cup 
During the 1978 FIFA World Cup, the stadium hosted two Group 2 matches, three Group 4 matches and three more during second round.

Other football events 

The Mario Kempes Stadium hosted three Group B matches and a semi-final match during the 1987 Copa América; five group stage matches, two round of 16 matches, a quarter-final match and a semi-final match at the 2001 FIFA World Youth Championship and at the 2011 Copa America, the stadium hosted two Group B matches, one Group A match and a quarter-final match.

The stadium also held the 2015 and 2016 finals of the Copa Argentina, and the 2015 Supercopa Argentina. Besides, the stadium hosted the 2020, where Defensa y Justicia were crowned champions after beating Lanús 3–0, and 2022 finals of Copa Sudamericana.

In 2022 the Stadium Mario Kempes hosted the Copa de la Liga Profesional final between Boca Juniors and Tigre.

Rugby union 
Mario Kempes Stadium has hosted several rugby union games of the Argentina national team. Likewise, Unión Cordobesa de Rugby used the stadium for defining instances of its annual championship, as well as its representative team played several matches against touring national sides.

Other sporting events 
The 1982 World Boxing Association world Super-Bantamweight title fight between champion Sergio Palma and former WBA world Bantamweight champion Jorge Luján was held there. The fight was won by Palma on a unanimous decision after 15 rounds.

Facilities 

The Mario Alberto Kempes Stadium is the center of a 40 hectares park and sports complex (named "Polo Deportivo Kempes") that includes the "Soledad García" provincial field hockey stadium, opened in 2012, that honors the two times world champion Soledad García; an Olympic-size swimming pool, opened in 2014 and named after the olympic medallist Georgina Bardach; an auxiliar field, located north of the main stadium, that hosts training and smaller football and rugby events; a BMX circuit, a running track, and basketball, volleyball and tennis facilities.

Since 2019, Polo Deportivo Kempes has hosted the Córdoba Open, a men's ATP World Tour 250 series tournament played on outdoor clay courts.

Concerts
Music concerts hosted at the Mario Kempes stadium include:

See also
 List of association football stadiums by capacity

Notes

References

External links

 Estadio Mario Kempes on Municipality of Córdoba (archived)
 Estadio Mario Kempes on Córdoba Turismo

1978 FIFA World Cup stadiums
m
e
m
Buildings and structures in Córdoba, Argentina
Sports venues completed in 1976
Event venues established in 1976
Sports venues in Córdoba Province, Argentina
Rally Argentina
1976 establishments in Argentina